Nataliya Dovhodko (born 7 February 1991 in Kyiv) is a Ukrainian female crew rower. She won a gold medal at the 2012 Summer Olympics in the quadruple sculls event with Kateryna Tarasenko, Anastasiya Kozhenkova, and Yana Dementyeva. Dovhodko was recognised the Merited Master of Sports for her 2012 Olympic feat.  That year, the team of Dovhodko, Tarasenko, Olga Hurkovska and Dementyeva also won the gold medal at the European Championships.

She represented the Central Sports Club of the Armed Forces of Ukraine (CSK ZSU).

References 

1991 births
Living people
Sportspeople from Kyiv
Armed Forces sports society (Ukraine) athletes
Ukrainian female rowers
Olympic rowers of Ukraine
Rowers at the 2012 Summer Olympics
Olympic gold medalists for Ukraine
Olympic medalists in rowing
Medalists at the 2012 Summer Olympics
European Rowing Championships medalists
Universiade medalists in rowing
Medalists at the 2013 Summer Universiade
Medalists at the 2015 Summer Universiade
21st-century Ukrainian women
20th-century Ukrainian women
Universiade gold medalists for Ukraine
Universiade silver medalists for Ukraine